The Greek Orthodox Metropolis of Mexico, headquartered in Mexico City, Mexico, is an eparchy of the Ecumenical Patriarchate of Constantinople.  Its current primate is Metropolitan Athenagoras of Mexico.

History 
Following the retirement of Archbishop Iakovos (Coucouzis) of America, Ecumenical Bartholomew I of Constantinople determined that the Church in the Western Hemisphere would be better served, if the then Greek Orthodox Archdiocese of North and South America were to be re-structured into separate jurisdictions.  Subsequently in July 1996, a new Metropolis for Central America and the Islands of the Caribbean was established, to which Metropolitan Athenagoras was elected.

The Metropolis covers a vast region, including Mexico, all the Countries of Central America, two Countries of South America, Colombia and Venezuela and all the Island Countries of the Caribbean, including Cuba, Puerto Rico, Haiti, and the Dominican Republic.

Since the Holy Metropolis of Mexico is under the direct jurisdiction of the Ecumenical Patriarchate, thus functioning separately and apart from the Archdiocese of America, nevertheless our Metropolis reflects and considers itself a daughter Church of the Church of America, which nurtured  the region of Central and South America throughout most of the previous century.

Finally, as the Holy Orthodox Metropolis of Mexico for the aforementioned Countries, we are the only legal and legitimate entity for this vast region, representing the Ecumenical Patriarchate and the Greek Orthodox Church.

Organization 
The Greek Orthodox Metropolis of Mexico Central America and the Caribbean Islands is a single metropolis with the countries of: Mexico, Guatemala, Belize, El Salvador, Honduras, Nicaragua, Costa Rica, Panama, Columbia, Venezuela, and the Caribbean Islands.  The central church, the Archdiocesan Church of Agia Sophia, is the headquarters of the Metropolis.

Metropolitan
Metropolitan Athenagoras of Mexico, since 1996

Assistant Bishops
 Bishop Isyhios of Marciana, since 2020
 Bishop  Timotheos of Assos, since 2020
 Bishop  Athenagoras of Myrina, since 2020

External links
 Greek Orthodox Diocese of Mexico

Eastern Orthodoxy in Mexico
Greek Orthodoxy in North America
Dioceses of the Ecumenical Patriarchate of Constantinople
Eastern Orthodox dioceses in North America
Dioceses in Mexico